William Earl Bergey (born February 9, 1945) is an American former football linebacker who played professionally for 12 seasons, most notably with the Philadelphia Eagles of National Football League (NFL). He was drafted by the Cincinnati Bengals of the American Football League (AFL) in 1969, the year before the AFL–NFL merger was completed, and continued to play with the Bengals in the NFL until 1973. Bergey subsequently signed with the Eagles the following year, where he played seven seasons until retiring in 1981. During his career, Bergey was named to five Pro Bowls, was a two-time first-team All-Pro, and made one Super Bowl appearance in Super Bowl XV, his final professional game. He is an inductee of the Eagles Hall of Fame and the Philadelphia Sports Hall of Fame.

College career
Bergey was born in South Dayton, New York, in 1945. He graduated from Pine Valley Central High School in 1964 and graduated from Arkansas State University (ASU) in 1969 with a Bachelor of Science degree in Physical Education. He was an All-American with the Arkansas State Indians and has been voted by fans the Top Player in Arkansas State history. He was a charter member of Delta Eta chapter of Kappa Alpha Order at ASU.

Bergey set ASU records for best tackling average in a season, most fumble recoveries in a season, most tackles in a game, most tackles in a season, and most career tackles. In 1968, Bergey averaged 19.6 tackles per game. He played in three post-season all-star games during his ASU career; he was selected to the All-Southland Conference team three times and to the Southland Conference All-First Decade Team. Bergey's jersey number 66 was retired by ASU.

Professional career

Cincinnati Bengals
Bergey was drafted by the American Football League's Cincinnati Bengals in the second round of the 1969 Common Draft and was an AFL All-Star in his first year. Bergey started for the Bengals for five years.

Florida Blazers futures contract and trade
Bergey signed a personal service contract on April 17, 1974 with Washington Capitols, Inc., the owner of the World Football League's Virginia Ambassadors which would be known as the Florida Blazers once the circuit began play in July of that year. He was to have joined the WFL team in May 1976, after his Bengals contract expired following the 1975 season. The Bengals filed suit against Bergey for breach of contract and a temporary restraining order against the WFL and its franchises two days later on April 19. In a hearing that began on April 29 and was adjudicated 15 days later on May 14, the Court concluded that Bergey had not breached his contract and the Bengals' motion for a temporary injunction was denied.

Bergey never received anything monetary from the Blazers and was released from his WFL contract. He was traded from the Bengals to the Philadelphia Eagles for a 1977 first-round selection (8th overall–Wilson Whitley) and first- and second-round picks in 1978 (8th and 35th overall–Ross Browner and Ray Griffin respectively) on July 10, 1974. He signed a five‐year contract upon joining the Eagles. The Blazers would not survive beyond the 1974 season, and the WFL itself failed partway through 1975.

Philadelphia Eagles
Bergey played a key role in the Eagles' subsequent rise, culminating in the trip to Super Bowl XV. With the Eagles, Bergey, a four-time All-Pro, set the NFL record for most interceptions by a linebacker and became the highest-paid defensive player in the league with a four-year contract for $1 million. He earned Eagles MVP status three times. Bergey recorded 234 tackles in a single season with the Eagles. He was a popular player who was the foundation of the "Gang Green" defense that brought the Eagles back to the playoffs in 1978, 1979, and to the Super Bowl in 1980.

Bergey had conflicts with guard Conrad Dobler of the Eagles' NFC East rival St. Louis Cardinals, who once spit on him while he was downed and injured. His and Dobler's volatile relationship was ranked by NFL Films at #9 on the NFL Top 10 list of feuds.

He retired from professional football in 1981. He was inducted into the Eagles Roll of Honor in 1988.  In 2012, the Professional Football Researchers Association named Bergey to the PFRA Hall of Very Good Class of 2012.

Personal life
During his playing days, Bergey served as a lieutenant in the Army Reserve.

Bergey served as a color commentator on Eagles radio broadcasts from 1982 to 1983, and now does pre-game and post-game radio and television commentary for the team during the season. He currently lives in Chadds Ford, Pennsylvania, with his wife Micky. He is a member of the Greater Buffalo Sports Hall of Fame.
 
His son Jake Bergey is a retired lacrosse player for the Philadelphia Wings of the National Lacrosse League and his son Josh Bergey is a retired lacrosse player for the Chesapeake Bayhawks of the Major League Lacrosse. Bill's brother Bruce Bergey was a standout player for the Portland Storm of the WFL.

References

External links
 Pro-Football-Reference.Com
 Report

See also
List of American Football League players

1945 births
Living people
American Football League All-Star players
American football middle linebackers
Arkansas State Red Wolves football players
Arkansas State University alumni
Cincinnati Bengals players
National Conference Pro Bowl players
National Football League announcers
People from Cattaraugus County, New York
Philadelphia Eagles announcers
Philadelphia Eagles players
Players of American football from New York (state)
American Football League players